The Adlam script is a script used to write Fulani. The name Adlam is an acronym derived from the first four letters of the alphabet (A, D, L, M), standing for Alkule Dandayɗe Leñol Mulugol, which means "the alphabet that protects the peoples from vanishing". It is one of many indigenous scripts developed for specific languages in West Africa. 

Adlam is supported in Google's Android and Chrome operating systems. There are also Android apps to send SMS in Adlam and to learn the alphabet. On computers running Microsoft Windows, the Adlam script was natively supported beginning with Windows 10 version 1903, which was released in May 2019. On macOS, the Adlam script was natively supported beginning with Ventura in 2022.

Development

While teenagers in the late 1980s, brothers Ibrahima and Abdoulaye Barry devised the alphabetic script to transcribe the Fulani language. One method they used involved them closing their eyes and drawing lines. After looking at their drawn shapes, they would pick which ones would look the most to them like a good glyph for a letter, and associate it with whatever sound they feel it would represent. Another method involved is thinking of a sound, imagining the look of a glyph for that sound, and drawing said glyph. After several years of development it began to be widely adopted among Fulani communities, and is currently taught not only regionally in Guinea, Nigeria, and Liberia but even as far as Europe and the United States.
In 2019, the character shapes were refined after practical usage.

Letters
Adlam has both upper and lower cases. They are written from right to left.

The letters are found either joined akin to Arabic or separate - the joined form is commonly used in a cursive manner; however, separate or block forms are also used as primarily for educational content.

Diacritics
Adlam has a number of diacritics. The 'consonant' modifier is used to derive additional consonants, mostly from Arabic, similar to e.g. s > š in Latin script.

Usage of the consonant modifier:

Usage of the dot to represent sounds borrowed from Arabic:

Use of the dot with native letters:

Digits
Unlike the Arabic script, Adlam digits go in the same direction (right to left) as letters, as in the N'Ko script.

Punctuation
Adlam punctuation is like Spanish in that there are initial and final forms of the question mark and exclamation mark, which are placed before and after the questioned or exclaimed clause or phrase.
The final forms are taken from the Arabic script.
The shape of the initial marks changed in 2019 as part of the efforts for Unicode standardization.

The hyphen is used for word breaks, and there are both parentheses and double parentheses.

Unicode

The Adlam alphabet was added to the Unicode Standard in June 2016 with the release of version 9.0.  The Unicode block for Adlam is U+1E900–U+1E95F:

References

Further reading

External links
 Winden Jangen, an organisation promoting Adlam
 The Adlam Story – How Alphabet Changes Culture ; Randall M. Hasson 
 Adlam at Omniglot, with a video pronouncing the basic letters
 Adlam virtual keyboard
 Latin-Adlam Transliterator
 The ADLaM Alphabet for Our People - Talks at Google session guested by Barry brothers explaining the origins of their script
 The brothers who created an alphabet - story from the BBC World Service 

Fula language
Alphabets
Writing systems of Africa
1989 introductions
Right-to-left writing systems
Constructed scripts